Shawano is a name derived from a modified Menominee word "Sāwanoh", which means south.

Places
United States
Shawano County, Wisconsin
Shawano, Wisconsin, city and county seat of Shawano County

Other
United States
Shawano Lake
Shawano Municipal Airport